There are lists of A-League Men players who have made the most appearances in the A-League Men, the top level of the Australian soccer league system.

Since the A-League Men's formation at the start of the 2005–06, four players have accrued 300 appearances in the A-League Men. The first player to reach the milestone was defender Andrew Durante, in representation of Newcastle Jets and Wellington Phoenix; his 300th match was Wellington's 3–2 win over Central Coast Mariners on 12 January 2019.

Leigh Broxham (Melbourne Victory) is the only player to have achieved to accoldate of 300+ A-League Men appearances exclusively for the club. Liam Reddy played for seven A-League Men clubs (the most for this achievement) on their way to 300+ A-League Men games. The only players from outside Oceania to play 200+ A-League Men games is Maltese defender Manny Muscat and Kosovan striker Besart Berisha.

List of players
Players are initially listed by number of appearances are equal, the players are then listed chronologically by the year of first appearance. If still tied, the players are listed alphabetically. Current A-League Men players and their current clubs are shown in bold.

Statistics are updated as of 28 May 2021.

Most appearances by club
Current A-League Men clubs and players are shown in bold, defunct clubs are in italics.

References

External links
 A-League Men official website

A-League Men players
Soccer in Australia
A-League Men lists
Association football player non-biographical articles